Lucy, the Daughter of the Devil is an American adult computer-animated television series that aired on Cartoon Network's late-night programming block Adult Swim. It was created and directed by Loren Bouchard (who later made the Fox show Bob's Burgers, which would also air on Adult Swim), produced by Williams Street with Loren Bouchard, LLC (now Wilo Productions) and Fluid Animation. The show starred Melissa Bardin Galsky as Lucy, the daughter of the Devil, who is voiced by H. Jon Benjamin (who would later voice the titular character of the aforementioned show). It is the first Adult Swim series to feature a female protagonist.

Production
The pilot episode "He's Not the Messiah, He's a DJ" first aired on October 30, 2005. After nearly 2 years and a number of re-airings, the show was picked up for a full season, which premiered on September 9, 2007. Although the show was in 4:3, there were black bars on the top and bottom of the screen, making it seem like a show in 16:9. Sometimes, characters and shots would appear behind the black bars.

Some changes were made between the pilot and the full series. The voice of Lucy was changed from Jessi Klein to Melissa Bardin Galsky; the third Special Father character, a black man missing an eye, was discarded and replaced with the Special Sister; and the cover of "Maneater" used as opening music was replaced for rebroadcasts.

Premise
The show follows the titular 21-year-old Lucy, who lives in San Francisco and has been ordained by her father, the devil, to fulfill her destiny as the Antichrist, whether she likes it or not. Along the way she meets up with a DJ named Jesús, who turns out to be the Second Coming of the messiah and the two begin dating from the first episode after Lucy saves him from a fire created by her father to kill him.

Meanwhile, her father tries different schemes in his quest to take over the world with the help of his "advocate," Becky, who acts as something of a personal assistant. At the same time a group of "Special Clergy," two priests and a nun, are on a mission from the Vatican to find and destroy Lucy.

Characters

 Lucy (Melissa Bardin Galsky) - The Antichrist, born of The Devil and an unnamed woman in exchange for a Datsun 280 ZX. An apparently normal young woman with the single exception of a small pair of devil horns, she has graduated from art school but is on no fixed career path, instead helping her father out in his ventures to conquer the world and taking a more-or-less permanent position as a bartender at his restaurant, Tequila Sally's, in the meanwhile. She is in a relationship with DJ Jesús, helps him in his different stunts, and seems to want to get him and her father close together. Lucy was voiced by Jessi Klein in the pilot.
 Jesús (Jon Glaser) - A DJ, claustrophobic escape artist, and the messiah who performs "nearacles" ("almost miracles, but not quite.") during his sets. He has a Hispanic accent.
 The Devil (H. Jon Benjamin) - The figure of pure evil, though he seems more playful and naughty than malevolent, and is willing to take over the world slowly and through schemes. Though he is certainly willing to outright kill the DJ when the possibility arises, he will also settle for lesser schemes to get him out of the way or even allow him to live if he believes he can benefit from it. He is often wearing a sweater that is a reference to Bill Cosby from The Cosby Show giving him a "Dad" look.
 Becky (Melissa Bardin Galsky) - Officially titled the Devil's Advocate, Becky serves as something of a personal assistant and manager for the Devil. Playing the level head to the Devil's flights of fancy, she is frequently annoyed at his schemes, voicing the opinion that they're rather pointless or unnecessarily involved. Her head is a fleshless skull. It is suggested in the pilot that Becky is the mother of Lucy.
 Judas (H. Jon Benjamin) - DJ Jesús' sycophantic personal assistant. He can usually be found at Jesús' side, helping him with his stunts. Among his responsibilities is wrangling the ever-present camera crew around the DJ.
 Senator Robert "Bob" Whitehead (Sam Seder) - A U.S. Senator who worships Satan, though he tries to keep it a secret from the public. The Devil has made plans for him to become President of the United States, with Lucy at his side; however, she is completely uninterested in him.
 The Special Clergy - A group of priests and a nun on a mission from the Vatican to save the world from the Antichrist. They collect rare religious artifacts and spy on characters with Satanic ties, to help them with their mission. The following are members of the Special Clergy:
 Special Father #1: Giuseppe Cantalupi (H. Jon Benjamin) - The apparent leader of the trio. He is heard giving a monologue at the beginning of almost every episode.
 Special Father #2: Benetti (Sam Seder) - The most quiet of the trio. He speaks with an Italian accent and is never seen without his night-vision goggles.
 Special Sister: Mary (Eugene Mirman) - With a lazy eye and a shrill, grating voice, Sister Mary seems to be the most dedicated to the Special Clergy's mission. She is not above killing innocent bystanders, and will do so at the slightest provocation.
 Ethan (Todd Barry) - Lucy's date in episode one "He's Not the Messiah, He's a DJ".

Episodes
The pilot first aired in 2005, and the series began in 2007. A unique feature of Lucy is that each episode features a different opening sequence with a new theme song.

International broadcast
In Canada, Lucy, the Daughter of the Devil previously aired on Teletoon's Teletoon at Night block,it also aired on 2x2 in Russia (voice over in Russian) and in German and European Spanish.  and aired on the Canadian version of Adult Swim.

Home release
In October 2010 the complete series was released on DVD, exclusive on the Adult Swim Shop, on Adultswim.com.

In addition to being available on DVD, all episodes are available on iTunes. Madman Entertainment said on the DVD sampler that the show will be released to DVD some time in 2011 along with other Williams Street shows like Assy McGee, Delocated and The Venture Bros. Season 4 part 1 and will be Australia's exclusive release.

References

External links

 
 

2000s American adult animated television series
2000s American horror comedy television series
2005 American television series debuts
2007 American television series endings
American adult animated comedy television series
American adult animated horror television series
American adult computer-animated television series
Demons in television
Fiction about the Devil
English-language television shows
Adult Swim original programming
Fictional demons and devils
Fictional depictions of the Antichrist
Television series by Williams Street
Television series created by Loren Bouchard
Television shows set in San Francisco